The 2009 Arab Youth Athletics Championships was the third edition of the international athletics competition for under-18 athletes from Arab countries. Organised by the Arab Athletic Federation, it took place in the Syrian city of Aleppo from 22 to 24 July. A total of thirty-eight events were contested, of which 20 by male and 18 by female athletes. The difference was accounted for by the lack of steeplechase and pole vault events for girls (the latter being dropped from the tournament due to a lack of entries).

As in 2007, Morocco and Bahrain – typically strong in the sport regionally – did not participate. Egypt topped the table for a second time running, winning eight gold medals in its haul of thirteen. Sudan had the next highest number of event winners, with seven. Algeria had the highest overall medal count, at 22 medals (four gold), and were followed by this ranking by the host nation, which took 20 medals (five gold). Tunisia also performed well, with five gold medals and a total of ten. Thirteen of the five nations present at the competition reached medal table.

A total of eleven championship records were broken at the competition. Awad El Karim Makki of Sudan set new records in both the boys' 200 metres and 400 metres events – defending the two titles he had won in 2007. Syria's Hamid Mansour also achieved a title defence and new record, doing so in the boys' discus throw, and managed to create a double by winning the shot put as well. Three girls managed individual doubles: Abir Barkaoui of Tunisia won the 200 m and 400 m, while Egypt's Fadia Saad Ibrahim and Rana Ahmed Taha swept the throws, taking the shot put/discus and javelin throw/hammer throw, respectively.

Makki of Sudan went on to win a medal at the 2009 World Youth Championships in Athletics, being the only 2009 Arab medallist to do so. Qatar's Mohammed Al-Garni later reached the 1500 m podium at the 2010 World Junior Championships in Athletics. Egyptians Rana Ahmed Taha and Wedian Moktar Abdelhamid claimed senior titles at the 2011 Arab Athletics Championships while their compatriot Fadia Saad Ibrahim became a senior Arab gold medallist in 2013.

Medal summary

Men

Women

Medal table

NB: The Tunisian athletics federation's medal counts excluded the medals for the women's 400 m hurdles and the women's javelin. The above tally includes these.

Participation

References

Results
3eme Championnats Arabes Des Cadets - Alep Syrie (22-23-24 Juillet 2009). Tunis Athletisme. Retrieved on 2015-05-30.

Arab Youth Athletics Championships
International athletics competitions hosted by Syria
Sport in Aleppo
Arab Youth Athletics Championships
Arab Youth Athletics Championships
2009 in youth sport